Richard Lauchert, a German portrait painter, was born at Sigmaringen in 1823. He studied at Munich in 1839, went for improvement to Paris in 1845, and settled at Berlin in 1860. He was mostly employed by the courts of Germany, England, and Russia, and painted portraits with great taste and ability, but many of his earlier productions are inferior to those of his later period. He died at Berlin in 1868.

References

External links

1823 births
1868 deaths
19th-century German painters
19th-century German male artists
German male painters
People from Sigmaringen